William Broughton Davies (1831–1906) was a Sierra Leonean Creole medical doctor who served in the British Colonial Army from 1860 to 1881. Davies was one of two West Africans to qualify as medical doctor in 1859. Hence Davies was the first West African to qualify for the medical profession.

Background
Davies was born in 1831 in the Liberated African village of Waterloo, Sierra Leone. His parents had been 'Aku' or Yoruba recaptives who had been rescued from slavery and had been deposited in Freetown, Sierra Leone. Davies was sent by his parents to the CMS Grammar School to train and eventually receive orders as a priest. Instead Davies, alongside Africanus Horton and Samuel Campbell he received a scholarship to study medicine in England. Davies and his companions eventually enrolled at King's College London in 1859. Because of the climate, Davies fell ill though eventually recovered. His compatriot, Samuel Campbell died after being ill. Davies married Mary Smith, half sister of Adelaide Casely-Hayford (daughter of William Smith, Jr.). After his time in the army, he returned to Freetown where he kept a private practice until his death.

References

Sierra Leone Creole people
19th-century Sierra Leonean physicians
1831 births
1906 deaths
Alumni of King's College London
Sierra Leonean people of Yoruba descent